Katerina "Katarina" Kolozova (born 20 October 1969) is a Macedonian academic, author and philosopher.

Biography 
She is a director of and professor of gender studies and philosophy at the Institute of Social Sciences and Humanities, Skopje and a professor of the University American College Skopje, both in Skopje, North Macedonia. She has been associated with speculative realism and has written about the non-philosophy of François Laruelle and the works of Karl Marx. She has been a member of the Organisation Non-Philosophique Internationale (International Organization of Non-Philosophy), with headquarters in Paris, France, since it was founded. She is a board member of The New Centre for Research & Practice of Grand Rapids, Michigan. Since 2021, Kolozova has been appointed Visiting Faculty at the Center for Philosophical Technologies at Arizona State University. She was a visiting scholar at the Department of Rhetoric at the University of California-Berkeley. Kolozova was a visiting professor at the University of Sarajevo and the University of Sofia.  She is a visiting professor at the Political Studies Department of the Faculty of Media and Communications Singidunum University in Belgrade. Since February 2022 till February 2023 (and still), Kolozova has been ranked #14 of the 25 most influential women in philosophy according to Academic Influence in the past 10 years.

Her teaching career started at her Alma Mater Ss Cyril and Methodius University of Skopje (ISPPI) as a graduate level Assistant professor in gender and communications studies (first appointment in the academic year of 1999-2000. She defended her PhD The Hellens and Death when she was only 28 years old (April 1998). 

She defended her PhD at the Faculty of Philosophy Skopje Ss Cyril and Methodius University in 1998, while her doctoral research entailed co-supervised work abroad with Jean Pierre Vernant in Paris (EHESS: Centre Louis Gernet) for which she earned a scholarship from the French Ministry of foreign affairs, ISH Ljubljana co-supervised by Svetlana Slapasak. The international dimension of her PhD research entailed a year-long fellowship at the Gender Studies Department at the Central European University (CEU) in Budapest (now in Vienna), in the form of "Doctoral Support Program" for which she earned a full scholarship and a stipend from CEU.  In 2009, Kolozova was a visiting/scholar (post-doc with a Fulbright scholarship) at UC-Berkeley working under the peer supervision of Judith Butler

Stance on the Macedonian-Bulgarian dispute
Kolozova is one of the public figures who strive to improve the relations between Bulgaria and North Macedonia. She is a member of the Friendship Club between the two countries. Kolozova maintains North Macedonia lacks political will to improve the relationships between the two states, but the Bulgarian side attaches too much importance to issue of the common history as a condition for improving the relations. Her understandings on that issue, aren't well received in North Macedonia.

Selected works 
Books
 The Death and the Greeks. On the Philosophical and Traditional Concepts of Death in Ancient Greece, Skopje: Kultura, 2000.
 The Real and 'I': On the Limit and the Self, Skopje: EuroBalkan Press ("Identities Series of Books"), 2006.  (in English) 
 The Cut of the Real: Subjectivity in Poststructuralist Philosophy, New York: Columbia University Press, 2014,  
 Toward a Radical Metaphysics of Socialism: Marx and Laruelle, Brooklyn, New York: Punctum Books, 2016, 
 The Lived Revolution: Solidarity with the Body in Pain as the New Political Universal. Skopje: Institute of Social Sciences and Humanities-Skopje, 2016 (in English) 
 Translation from Ancient Greek of Euripides' Medea, with an Introductory Study and Commentaries. Skopje: Ad Verbum, 2016. (in Macedonian) 
 Capitalism’s Holocaust of Animals: A Non-Marxist Critique of Capital, Philosophy and Patriarchy. London UK: Bloomsbury Academic, 2019, 
 Co-authored with Paul Cockshott and Greg Michaelson, "Materialism and Mechanicity" forthcoming with Sublation Press (New York/London UK)  

As editor
 (editor) Classic Readings in Gender Theory, Skopje: EuroBalkan Press, 2003.
 (co-editor with Svetlana Slapšak and Jelisaveta Blagojevic) Gender and Identity: Theories from/on Southeastern Europe Belgrade/Utrecht: Advanced Thematic Network for Women’s Studies in Europe-ATHENA, 2006. (in English) 
 (co-editor and contributor) Conversations with Judith Butler: Crisis of the Unitary Subject Skopje: "Euro-Balkan" Press, 2007. (in Macedonian and in English) 
 (co-editor with Eileen Joy) After the Speculative Turn: Realism, Philosophy and Feminism, Brooklyn, New York: Punctum Books, 2016. .
 (co-editor with Niccolò Milanese) “Illiberal Democracies” in Europe: An Authoritarian Response to the Crisis of Illiberalism Washington D.C: Illiberalism Studies Program, The Institute for European, Russian, and Eurasian Studies, The George Washington University, 2023 (in English)

See also
 Gjorgji Kolozov, her father, an actor

References 

Living people
Academic staff of University American College Skopje
Macedonian philosophers
1969 births
20th-century Macedonian writers
21st-century Macedonian writers